Scarlet Evil Witching Black is the second album by the Greek black metal band Necromantia. It was released in 1995 on Osmose Productions and in 2002 it was re-issued as part of the Cults of the Shadow double CD. In 2006 the album was re-issued with a bonus track by Black Lotus records as part of a boxed set titled Necromantia containing the three full lengths and the Ancient Pride EP.

Track listing
 "Devilskin" – 5:50
 "Black Mirror" – 6:30
 "Pretender to the Throne (Opus I: The Userper's Spawn)" – 5:28
 "The Arcane Light of Hecate" – 4:20
 "Scarlet Witching Dreams" – 5:28
 "The Serpent and the Pentagram" – 5:21
 "Pretender to the Throne (Opus II: Battle at the Netherworld)" – 7:51
 "Spiritdance" – 6:26
 "Demon's Whip" (Manowar cover, bonus track on 2006 re-issue)

References

1995 albums
Necromantia albums